David Lewis Jones  (4 January 1945 – 15 October 2010) was a Welsh librarian and historian who was the librarian of the House of Lords Library from 1991 to 2006.

Early life and education

Jones was born in Riversdale, Aberaeron, Cardiganshire, to Gwilym and Joyce Jones. He was educated at Aberaeron Grammar School and read history at Jesus College, Oxford.

Career

Librarian
Jones began his career as an assistant librarian at the Institute of Historical Research in London, 1970–72, before returning to Wales for five years as the law librarian at the University College of Wales, Aberystwyth, 1972–77.

In 1977, Lord Elwyn-Jones, Lord Chancellor in the Labour Government, recruited Jones to fill the post of deputy librarian of the House of Lords Library. This followed a report by a working group, led by David Eccles, 1st Viscount Eccles, that recommended creating a research service, hiring qualified librarians for the first time, acquiring updated books, and "dipping a toe in information technology". From 1977 to 1991, Jones, the first qualified librarian to serve in the post of deputy librarian, assisted Roger Morgan in transforming the librarian to modern standards.

Working directly with Eccles, Jones oversaw the installation of the Geac ADVANCE multiuser integrated online library system "incorporating acquisitions, cataloguing and serials control features and online access to that catalogue." Jones also create a significant programme for the conservation and cataloguing of the library's historic collections.

Jones succeed Morgan as librarian in 1991 and continued to work to modernise the library. cooperating with the House of Commons Library in developing shared online systems. Over his 15 years as librarian, he oversaw expansion of the library's holdings and tripled its staff from 10 to 30 by bringing highly qualified research clerks, librarians and secretarial staff to meet the increased demand from the Lords for quick access to research and information.

In 1999, Jones contributed to upgrades to the working law library for the Law Lords at the Palace of Westminster's West Front.

Morgan was appointed a Commander of the Order of the British Empire (CBE) in the 2005 Birthday Honours, in anticipation of his retirement.

He retired in 2006 and was succeeded by Elizabeth Hallam-Smith.

Historian
David Lewis Jones was a prolific historian, biographer and bibliographer. He contributed several entries for the biographical dictionaries  Oxford Dictionary of National Biography and the Dictionary of Welsh Biography, and authored a book on Eirene White, Baroness White.

From 1994 to 1996, he served as secretary to the Honourable Society of Cymmrodorion. In 1996, he was admitted to the Gorsedd at the National Eisteddfod of Wales in Llandeilo for his services for Welsh culture.

Personal life

He died in Chiswick, London, following surgery at age 65.

Bibliography

References

1945 births
2010 deaths
People from Aberaeron
Welsh librarians
20th-century Welsh historians
Alumni of Jesus College, Oxford
Commanders of the Order of the British Empire
Welsh bibliographers
21st-century Welsh historians